Lake Pumacocha (possibly from Quechua puma cougar, puma, qucha lake) is a lake in Peru located in Laraos District, Yauyos Province, Lima. It has an elevation of 4,388 m and about 2 km long. Sima Pumaqucha which is considered the deepest cave in the Andes is located near the lake.

See also
 Qaqa Mach'ay
List of lakes in Peru

References

Lakes of Peru
Lakes of Lima Region